FUQERRBDY is the eighth and final studio album by Detroit rap group Natas. This is the group's first studio album as a trio since 2002's Godlike and first Natas album since 2006's N of tha World. It was released on July 15, 2014 on the newly relaunched Reel Life Productions and Lyrikal Snuff Productions. This is the final Natas album with TnT, who was killed in a car accident on December 20, 2014.

Background and recording
In 2013 it was announced on Mastamind's official Facebook account that a new Natas album has been planned and after the release of his next album "The Ultimate Price" they will begin recording the album with an expected 2014 release date. This was later confirmed by Esham and than later by Mastamind's label lyrikal Snuff Productionz. On December 8, 2013 once again via his official Facebook account, Mastamind announced that recording of the new Natas album was completed and was in the mixing stages. Esham, Mastamind, and the official Natas Facebook confirmed that "FUQERRBDY" will be released on July 15, 2014.

Track listing

Official release (digital) 
 Fuqerrbdy – 3:31
 I Love You - 3:33
 On Some - 3:56
 N.I.K.E. - 2:41
 Question Mark - 2:32
 Dead Woke - 2:31
 Convulsions - 3:19
 The World Iz Natas - 3:18
 Smokkk En Drankkk - 3:51
 Future Kill - 5:37
 Burn - 2:40
 But Not Us - 3:29
 Where Yo Hood @ - 3:02
 Lord Have Mercy - 3:47
 747 - 4:32

Unofficial and uncut (limited edition CD) 
 Fuqerrbdy
 I Love You
 Itz A New Day
 Super High Maintenance
 N.I.K.E.
 Question Mark
 Dead Woke
 Convulsions
 Janet Yellen
 Future Kill
 Sigmund Freud
 But Not Us
 Another Love Song
 Where Yo Hood @
 The One Who Never Dies
 Lord Have Mercy
 747

References

2014 albums
Natas (group) albums